Godzilla: Save the Earth is a fighting video game based on Toho's Godzilla franchise. It is developed by Pipeworks Software, published by Atari, and released in 2004 for PlayStation 2 and Xbox.

The game is a sequel to 2002's Godzilla: Destroy All Monsters Melee, and was followed by Godzilla: Unleashed in 2007.

Gameplay
The gameplay is identical to the previous game, although it plays at a more sluggish pace and allows monsters to use their beam attacks more frequently. New additions included elevated terrains, a challenge mode, online play, and a slightly more cohesive story mode that includes limited traveling sections and underwater levels. The game introduced seven new playable monsters: Baragon, Jet Jaguar, Megaguirus, Moguera, Mothra, and SpaceGodzilla. Biollante was going to be included (as she was fully programmed into the game), but was cut due to licensing reasons.

Plot
Save the Earth takes place two years after Godzilla: Destroy All Monsters Melee. The story involves mankind getting hold of Godzilla's DNA, known in the game as "G-Cells." The Vortaak learn of this, once again returning to Earth, controlling a vast army of monsters, including their ultimate weapon: SpaceGodzilla. The player faces down many controlled monsters in different locations. In the climax cut-scene, Godzilla confronts SpaceGodzilla in a final duel. Godzilla blasts off SpaceGodzilla's shoulder crystals causing a black hole to form. SpaceGodzilla is sucked in and apparently killed, forcing the Vortaak to retreat while Godzilla lets out a victorious roar, having saved the Earth yet again.

Reception

Godzilla: Save the Earth received mixed reviews on both platforms according to video game review aggregator Metacritic.

1UP gave the game a "B−" score, saying: "Godzilla: Save the Earth is a fun game and a worthy sequel to Godzilla: Destroy All Monsters Melee. If it had been afforded a little more finesse (especially regarding the Challenges) and a little more authentic Godzilla flavor, it'd be even sweeter. The fact is, though, that unless you're a Godzilla fan, there are better games of this general type out there (War of the Monsters and Def Jam: Fight for New York come to mind). Still, the kaiju in Godzilla's universe are way cooler than grown, sweaty men in tights."

References

External links

Interview With Simon Strange

2004 video games
PlayStation 2 games
Xbox games
Science fiction video games
Kaiju video games
Godzilla games
3D fighting games
Video game sequels
Video games developed in the United States
Atari games
Video games set in New York City
Video games set in San Francisco
Video games set in Seattle
Video games set in London
Video games set in Tokyo
Video games set in Osaka
Video games set in Boston
Video games set in Los Angeles
Video games set on fictional islands
Video games set on fictional planets
Pipeworks Studios games
Multiplayer and single-player video games